Typhina carolskoglundae is a species of sea snail, a marine gastropod mollusk in the family Muricidae, the murex snails or rock snails.

Description
The length of the shell attains 21.1 mm.

Distribution
This marine spêcies was found off Cébaco Island, Panama.

References

External links
  Houart, R.; Hertz, C. M. (2006). A review of Typhisopsis and Typhisala (Gastropoda: Muricoidea) of the eastern Pacific. The Nautilus. 120 (2): 52-65.

carolskoglundae
Gastropods described in 2006